Gilbert Lascault (25 October 1934 – 19 December 2022) was a French novelist, essayist, and art critic.

Biography 
Lascault was born in Strasbourg on 25 October 1934. Agrégé of philosophy in 1960, Gilbert Lascault began writing his thesis, « Le monstre dans l’art occidental » ("The monster in Western art"), an essay of aesthetics inaugurating his writings to come. He discovered contemporary art by meeting Henri Michaux and Jean Dubuffet.

An engraver and calligrapher, Gilbert Lascault taught aesthetics and the philosophy of art at the Paris West University Nanterre La Défense (from 1988) then at the Sorbonne (since the second half of the 1990s), "proposing" seminars of uncertainty "to students and researchers in philosophy, art history and plastic arts".

A specialist in surrealism, he has published several books on this subject.

In 1995, he was the guest of honor of the Oulipo.

Lascault wrote extensively on the works of artists such as Jean Dubuffet, Jean Tinguely, Pierre Alechinsky, Jean Le Gac, Vladimir Veličković, Coco Téxèdre, Anne and Patrick Poirier, Henri Cueco, Christian Boltanski, Leonardo Cremonini, Bang Hai Ja.…

Lascault died on 19 December 2022, at the age of 88.

 Publications 
 1963: Le Monstre dans l'art occidental, 
 1969: Esthétique et psychanalyse, in La Psychanalyse, collectif, éd.: S.G.P.P.; series "Le point de la question"
 1975: Un monde miné, 
 1976: Enfances choisies, Christian Bourgois
 1976: With Gianfranco Baruchello, Alphabet d'Éros, Paris, Ed. Galilée
 1977: Figurées, défigurées : petit vocabulaire de la féminité représentée, Union générale d’édition (UGE), series , Paris
 1977: Un îlot tempéré, Christian Bourgois
 1979: Écrits timides sur le visible, UGE, 10/18, Paris
 1979: Voyage d'automne et d'hiver, Christian Bourgois
 1981: La destinée de Jean Simon Castor, Christian Bourgois
 1981: Boucles et nœuds, 
 1982: Alexandre Bonnier - Autour d'images et d'écrits, Editions Shakespeare International
 1982: Un herbier pour  1983: Encyclopédie abrégée de l'empire vert, Maurice Nadeau
 1983: Marmottes à l'imparfait (illustrations by Jan Voss), Ryōan-ji
 1983: Arrondissements (illustrations by Pierre Alechinsky ), Repères
Fata Morgana, Montpellier
 1984: Malaval, Art Press/Flammarion
 1985: Faire et défaire, éd. Fata Morgana, Montpellier
 1985: Éloges à Geneviève, novel, Balland
 1985: Francis Limérat and Jean-Pierre Vielfaure - Les arpenteurs de l'utopie, parcours, Éditions du C.A.C. Pablo-Neruda, Corbeil-Esonnes
 1986: La Grande Forêt Alquin, illustrations by Nicolas Alquin, éd. Le Salon d’Art, Brussels
 1986: Les amours d'Arthur-toujours-là et de Monica-Belle-de-Givre, illustrations by Petra Werlé, Baby Lone, Strasbourg
 1986: Consanguins d'Omènes, illustrations by Janko Stanovnik, éd. Tropismes
 1987: Jeux d’échecs – Jeu de guerres, illustrations by Nicolas Alquin, éd. L’Échoppe, Caen
 1987: 420 minutes dans la cité des ombres, éd. Ramsay, Caen
 1989: Le petit chaperon rouge, partout, 
 1992: Jour de désert, illustrations by Nicolas Alquin, éd. L’Échoppe
…
 2014: Les Chambres hantées, Tarabuste éditions

 See also 
 Collège de 'Pataphysique
 Artist's book
 Oulipo

 References 

 External links 
 Gilbert Lascault on Babelio
 "Les chambres hantées" de Gilbert Lascault au musée Saint-Roch d'Issoudun
 Gilbert Lascault, "au royaume du visible joyeux" on Le Monde (15 May 2008)
 Gilbert Lascault lit "Histoires en forme de trèfle" (1990) on YouTube
 Article by Évelyne Toussaint  on the site Archives de la critique d'art Gilbert Lascault on France Culture
 Gilbert Lascault on La Nouvelle quinzaine littéraire''

1934 births
2022 deaths
20th-century French essayists
20th-century French non-fiction writers
French art critics
Prix France Culture winners
Writers from Strasbourg